Rapidum was a Roman settlement and fort located in Mauretania Caesariensis, nearly 100 km south of Icosium (Algiers).

History 
The Romans built a fort in what is now Sour Djouab (south of present-day Algiers) during the first century of their rule in Mauretania between Castellum Tingitanum (El Asnam) and Auzia (Sour el Ghozlane), in order to expand their control of the interior of the region. Soon under Hadrian near the fort grew up a civilian settlement called "Rapidum", on the Roman road called the Nova Praetentura, which connected Numidia with Mauretania Tingitana and passed through Rapidum.

The original castrum of Rapidum remained until 201 AD, while the town survived until emperor Aurelian when it was destroyed by Berber nomads. The later emperor Diocletian rebuilt it during the late 3rd century with huge buildings which lasted until the Arab invasions.

The initial garrison of Rapidum fort was – according to historian M. Ruiu – the Cohors II Sardorum and protected the new limes of the Roman Empire moved south from the Mediterranean shores to a military road called Nova Praetentura. This road went from Rapidum near Numidia to Altava and to Numerus Syrorum at the border of Mauretania Tingitana.

Rapidum was named "municipium"  and had an extension of 15 hectares under Marcus Aurelius (with nearly 4,000 inhabitants, mostly romanised Berbers, like Auzia).

The city was later destroyed by Berber rebellions, but Diocletian restored the city that had even huge Roman thermae.  Pieces of colossal statues of Jupiter and Minerva suggest the existence of a "Capitol". There also undoubtedly was a temple to Ceres.

The fort was abandoned around 325 AD, while the city remained some centuries more (even if it never fully recovered).

Rapidum was conquered by the Vandals and later reduced to a small village, probably Christian (at Aïn Tamda, just west of Rapidum ruins, a group of Christian buildings (church and monastery) has been excavated)- was occupied by the Romano–Berber Kingdom of Altava in the 6th century. It disappeared with the Muslim conquest of the Maghreb in the 7th century. Today only some ruins remain, excavated in the 1920s by the French colonists.

Bishopric

Rapidum was center of an ancient bishopric and remains a titular see of the Roman Catholic Church in the province of Mauretania Caesariensis.

Bishops
Raul Nicolau Gonçalves (5 Jan 1967 Appointed – 30 Jan 1978) 
Gyula Szakos (31 Mar 1979 Appointed – 5 Apr 1982) 
Mieczyslaw Jaworski (7 May 1982 Appointed – 19 Aug 2001) 
Brian Vincent Finnigan (31 Jan 2002 Appointed – )

See also

 Altava
 Icosium
 Castellum Tingitanum
 Icosium
 Mauretania Caesariensis
 Rusadir
 Pomaria

References

Bibliography 
 Seston, Williams. Le secteur de Rapidum sur le Limes de Mauritanie césarienne après les fouilles de 1927 Persee Scientific Journals, volume 45. 1928

External links
Digital Atlas of the Roman empire: Rapidum

Populated places established in the 1st century
Populated places disestablished in the 7th century
Archaeological sites in Algeria
Roman towns and cities in Mauretania Caesariensis
Roman fortifications in Mauretania Caesariensis
Ancient Berber cities
1920s archaeological discoveries
Buildings and structures completed in the 1st century
1st-century establishments in the Roman Empire
7th-century disestablishments in the Exarchate of Africa
Catholic titular sees in Africa